Bhatpara Neelkuthi is a ruined indigo factory situated in Gangni Upazila of Meherpur District, Bangladesh. It was built by the British in 1778.

Location 

There is a mango garden beside the cottage. There is also a ruined church on the northwest part of the garden. A very shallow river named Kazla flows by the Neelkuthi. It's contemporary to amjhupi Neelkuthi.

References

External links 
 

 
Buildings and structures in Khulna Division